This is a list of the tallest buildings in Sweden. The history of skyscrapers in Sweden began with the completion of Kungstornen on Kungsgatan in Stockholm. The twin towers are each 60 m (197 ft) high and were completed in 1924 and 1925 respectively. In 1927 Thor Thörnblad proposed an American inspired skyscraper on Blasieholmen in Stockholm, the proposal was 40 floors and 150 meters high. This would have made it the tallest skyscraper in Europe by a large margin at the time. In the Post-World War II era construction of several high-rise buildings began, such as Wenner-Gren Center, Skatteskrapan, Hötorgsskraporna, Folksamhuset, and Kronprinsen. Entering the 21st century a new wave of high-rise buildings has reached Sweden until 2023.Turning Torso in Malmö stood as the tallest building in Sweden and Scandinavia.

Many Swedish skyscraper projects have been canceled after protests, or because the plans were proved economically unsustainable. A 200 m (656 ft) high skyscraper, called Tell Us Tower, was planned for construction in 2010 at Telefonplan in Stockholm's southern suburbs, but the plans were canceled in 2007. There were plans to construct a 325 m (1,066 ft) high skyscraper, Scandinavian Tower, in Malmö, but they were canceled in 2004. If built, the Scandinavian Tower would have been the tallest skyscraper in Europe.

Definition 

 

The Council on Tall Buildings and Urban Habitat recognizes a building only if at least 50% of its height is made up of floor plates containing habitable floor area. Structures that do not meet this criterion, such as the Kaknästornet or Uppsala Cathedral, are defined as "towers".

This list ranks high-rises / skyscrapers in Sweden based on the CTBUH height criteria:

 Height to architectural top: This is the main criterion under which the CTBUH ranks the height of buildings. Heights are measured from the level of the lowest, significant, open-air, pedestrian entrance to the top of the building, inclusive of spires but excluding items such as flagpoles and antennae.
 Highest occupied floor: Height to the floor level of the highest floor that is occupied by residents, workers or other building users on a consistent basis.
 Height to tip: Height to the highest point of the building, including antennae, flagpoles, and technical equipment.

Building heights are measured in "plushöjd" with the RH2000 vertical reference system in Sweden, which shares its zero point with the NAP. The zero point is approximately at sea level. A common mistake is therefore to cite the "plushöjd" as the building's height, which in fact is the height above sea level.

If a source states no specific type of height it is displayed in the "Height to architectural top" category, which is also the official height. Unknowns are represented by a 0.

Tallest buildings

Under construction

Approved 
This list also includes buildings under construction during the site clearing phase.

Proposed

See also 
 List of tallest structures in Sweden
 List of tallest buildings in Scandinavia

Notes

References

External links 
 Diagram of Swedish skyscrapers on SkyscraperPage

Lists of buildings and structures in Sweden
Sweden
Sweden